Dasht-e Sefid (also Romanized as Dasht-e Sefīd) is a village in Chashm Rural District, Shahmirzad District, Mehdishahr County, Semnan Province, Iran. At the 2006 census, its population was 43, in 13 families.

References 

Populated places in Mehdishahr County